The Lebanese Elite Cup 2009 is the 12th edition of this football tournament in Lebanon. It will be held from August 29 to September 13, 2009. This tournament includes the five best teams from the 2008-09 season and the Cup Winner. Since both cup finalists, Al-Ahed and Shabab Al Sahel, finished among the first five in the league, sixth placed Al-Mabarrah qualified as well.

The draw took place on May 29, 2009 in Beirut.

Teams

Group stage

Group A

Group B

Knock-out stage

Semi finals

Final

Lebanese Elite Cup seasons
Elite